Marumalarchi is a 1956 Indian Tamil-language film directed by K. S. Prakash Rao and Lanka Sathyam. The film stars Sriram and G. Varalakshmi. It was released on 16 November 1956.

Plot

Cast 
List adapted from the database of Film News Anandan and from the book Thiraikalanjiyam.

Male cast
Sriram
M. N. Nambiar
E. R. Sahadevan
Female cast
G. Varalakshmi
E. V. Saroja
T. M. Meenakshi

Production 
The film was produced by C. V. Reddy and was directed by K. S. Prakash Rao and Lanka Sathyam. Story was by T. B. Dharma Rao and S. A. Subburaman while the dialogues were written by S. A. Subburaman and B. Nageswara Rao. Cinematography was handled by Jagheerdar, R. R. Chandran and Mukundhan while the editing was done by Veerappan and Marthandam. Art direction was by Kotwanker and Choreography was handled by Vempatti Sathyam. Still photography was done by Sathyam.

The film was also produced in Telugu with the title Melukolupu.

Soundtrack 
Music was composed by Pendyala Nageswara Rao while the lyrics were penned by M. S. Subramaniam.

References

External links 

Indian drama films
Films directed by K. S. Prakash Rao
Indian multilingual films
Films scored by Pendyala Nageswara Rao
1950s Tamil-language films
1956 drama films